Reg Parker (fourth ¼ 1927 – 13 November 2014) was an English professional rugby league footballer who played in the 1940s, 1950s and 1960s, coach of the 1970s, and was an administrator of the 1980s.

Background
Parker's birth was registered in Ulverston district, Lancashire, England, and he died aged 87 at Cartmel Grange Care Home, Grange-over-Sands, Cumbria, his funeral service took place at St Paul's Parish Church, Grange-over-Sands, at 1 pm on Tuesday 25 November 2014, followed by a reception at the Netherwood Hotel

Playing career

International honours
Parker won a cap for England while at Barrow in 1955 against Other Nationalities.

Challenge Cup Final appearances
Parker played right-, i.e. number 12, in Barrow's 21-12 victory over Workington Town in the 1955 Challenge Cup Final during the 1954–55 season at Wembley Stadium, London on Saturday 30 April 1955, in front of a crowd of 66,513, and played right-, i.e. number 10, in the 7–9 defeat by Leeds in the 1957 Challenge Cup Final during the 1956–57 season at Wembley Stadium, London on Saturday 11 May 1957, in front of a crowd of 76,318.

County Cup Final appearances
Parker played right-, i.e. number 12, and scored a try in Barrow's 12–2 victory over Oldham in the 1954 Lancashire County Cup Final during the 1954–55 season at Station Road, Swinton on Saturday 23 October 1954.

Club career
Parker made his début for Barrow against Belle Vue Rangers in 1948, he was transferred in 1958 for £800 (based on increases in average earnings, this would be approximately £38,470 in 2013), and he made his début for Wakefield Trinity playing  (replacing an injured Ken Traill) in the 17–12 victory over St. Helens at Belle Vue, Wakefield on Saturday 1 February 1958, also making their début in that match were Geoffrey Oakes and Harold Poynton, due to the difficulties in travelling from Grange-over-Sands to Wakefield, at the end of the 1957–58 season he was transferred to Blackpool Borough, where he later became a director.

Coaching career

International honours
Parker was Great Britain's manager for the 1974 tour of Australia and New Zealand, and the 1977 World Cup.

Parker coached England for one game v Wales in a 28-9 win on 14 Oct 1984 in Ebbw Vale.

Genealogical information
Reg Parker's marriage to Shirley (née Cummock birth registered third ¼  in Barton-upon-Irwell district) was registered during fourth ¼ 1949 in Ulverston district. They had children; Karen S. Parker (birth registered first ¼  in Ulverston district), and Simon L. Parker (birth registered fourth ¼  in Ulverston district). S Louise Parker (birth registered July - August 1963 (age 54-55) in Ulverston district).

References
1951 England statistics inadvertently allocated from Batley's George Palmer at rugbyleagueproject.org.

External links
(archived by web.archive.org) Back on the Wembley trail
(archived by archive.is) On This Day 12 September
(archived by archive.is) Willie do it? Holt on brink of breaking Horne total
(archived by web.archive.org) Barrow Wembley Legend Joins Tributes To Reg Parker
(archived by web.archive.org) Barrow RL Challenge Cup Winner Reg Parker Dies
(archived by web.archive.org) RL Pays Tribute To Barrow Great Reg Parker
(archived by web.archive.org) Reg Parker Obituary
(archived by web.archive.org) Rugby League mourns Reg Parker
(archived by web.archive.org) Rugby League – Former RFL chairman Reg Parker dies
Rugby League Cup Final 1955
Rugby League Final 1957

1927 births
2014 deaths
Barrow Raiders players
Blackpool Borough players
England national rugby league team coaches
England national rugby league team players
English rugby league coaches
English rugby league players
Lancashire rugby league team players
Rugby Football League chairmen
Rugby league players from Ulverston
Rugby league props
Rugby league second-rows
Wakefield Trinity players